De Mille Peak is a summit in Washington County, Utah, in the United States with an elevation of . It is in the Canaan Mountain Wilderness and near the southern boundary of Zion National Park.

De Mille Peak was named in honor of Bishop Oliver De Mille, a Mormon pioneer.

References

Mountains of Washington County, Utah
Mountains of Utah